On 3 August 1979, a Constitutional Convention election was held in Sistan and Baluchestan Province with plurality-at-large voting format in order to decide the two seats for the Assembly for the Final Review of the Constitution.

Both candidates who won the election belonged to the Sunni Baloch community in the province. The Shia cleric supported by the Islamic Republican Party was defeated.

Results

 
 
|-
|colspan="14" style="background:#E9E9E9;"|
|-
 
 

|-
|colspan=14|
|-
|colspan=14|Source:

References

1979 elections in Iran
Sistan and Baluchestan Province